Barry Bolton is an English myrmecologist, an expert on the classification, systematics, and taxonomy of ants, who long worked at the Natural History Museum, London. He is known especially for monographs on African and Asian ants, and for encyclopaedic global works, including the Identification Guide to Ant Genera (1994), A New General Catalogue of Ants of the World (1995, updated in 2007), Synopsis and Classification of Formicidae (2003), and Bolton's Catalogue of Ants of the World: 1758-2005 (2007). Now retired, Bolton is a Fellow of the Royal Entomological Society and Myrmecologist, Biodiversity Division, Department of Entomology, Natural History Museum, London.

Recognition 
At least 21 species of ants are named in Bolton's honour:

 Anochetus boltoni
 Anomalomyrma boltoni
 Cataulacus boltoni
 Chimaeridris boltoni 
 Cryptomyrmex boltoni
 Daceton boltoni
 Leptanilla boltoni
 Loweriella boltoni
 Meranoplus boltoni
 Monomorium boltoni
 Myrmica boltoni 
 Nylanderia boltoni 
 Pheidole boltoni 
 Plagiolepis boltoni
 Polyrhachis boltoni
 Pristomyrmex boltoni
 Proceratium boltoni 
 Stigmatomma boltoni 
 Strumigenys boltoni
 Tetramorium boltoni

Literature
 Bolton, B. (1994) Identification Guide to the Ant Genera of the World, Harvard University Press.
 Bolton, B., Gary Alpert, Philip S. Ward and Piotr Naskrecki (2007). Bolton's Catalogue of Ants of the World 1758-2005, Harvard University Press.
 Bolton, B. (2003). Synopsis and Classification of Formicidae. Memoirs of the American Entomological Institute, vol 71., pp. 1–370. Bolton's Synopsis and Classification of Ants of the World
 Bolton's publications. List of publications and pdfs at antbase.org.

References

External links
  Bolton's Catalogue of Ants of the World

Living people
Entomologists from London
Myrmecologists
Year of birth missing (living people)
Fellows of the Royal Entomological Society